Ramal de Neves-Corvo is a railway branch in Portugal, which connects the station of Ourique, on the Linha do Alentejo, to the Neves-Corvo mine.

See also 
 List of railway lines in Portugal
 List of Portuguese locomotives and railcars
 History of rail transport in Portugal

References

Railway lines in Portugal
Iberian gauge railways